Totegegie Airport  is an airport on Totegegie Island in the Gambier Islands, French Polynesia. It is 9 km northeast of the village of Rikitea.

It has the only building on the reef. Its only commercial service is to Tahiti's Fa'a'ā International Airport on Tuesdays.

Totegegie Airport is crucial in its role as the outside world's link to Pitcairn Island. One of the few ways a traveler can reach Pitcairn is to fly to Tahiti, then to Totegegie. From there, a 32-hour boat ride will take one to Pitcairn.

History 
The  runway was constructed in 1967 by the 115th running of the Society of the Pacific Experimentation Centre Pacific (CEP). The first aircraft, a Piper Aztec, landed in 1968. The same year, a DC-6 performed weekly service between Totegegie, Mururoa and Papeete. In 1978, the first commercial air link was established between Totegegie and Papeete.

The French army buildings were decommissioned in 1998. At the end of operations 50 tons of scrap metal had been collected.

In 2008, the terminal was expanded and modernized.

Airlines and destinations

Passenger

Ground transportation 
The airport is connected to Mangareva and its city Rikitea by boat.

From Mangareva there are boats going to Pitcairn Island, the main way of getting there.

Passengers

References 

Airports in French Polynesia
Gambier Islands
Airports established in 1967
1967 establishments in French Polynesia